The synthome comprises the set of all reactions that are available to a chemist for the synthesis of small molecules.  The word was coined by Stephen F. Martin.

References

Chemical synthesis